Lyndon B. Johnson High School is a secondary school located in Laredo, Texas, United States. LBJHS is a part of the United Independent School District, and it serves a portion of south Laredo and the neighboring cities of El Cenizo and Rio Bravo, as well as the census-designated place of La Presa. Home of the BLISIA early college and regular early college.

Background
LBJ High School opened in 2001 with its first graduating class in 2005. Its colors are purple, black, and gold.

On June 4, 2014, two LBJ High School students were caught on video surveillance for allegedly smearing paint and writing graffiti on school property. Graffiti placed on a school or public monument is a state jail felony in Texas if the loss is under $20,000. Some 30 students and staff spent hours trying to clean up the vandalism. No arrests were immediately made when the alleged offenders were detained by campus police.

In 2014, LBJ High School fell short of minimum state standards and have been placed on the Public Education Grant list.

Mascot
The mascot for LBJ High School is a wolf.

Standardized dress
Starting in the 2007–2008 school year, students were required to follow the standardized dress code provided by the district.

Purple is Johnson's designated extra shirt color choice. The Texas Education Agency specified that the parents and/or guardians of students zoned to a school with uniforms may apply for a waiver to opt out of the uniform policy so their children do not have to wear the uniform; parents must specify "bona fide" reasons, such as religious reasons or philosophical objections.

Feeder schools
Feeder elementary schools include:
 Arndt Elementary School
 Juarez-Lincoln Elementary School
 Kennedy-Zapata Elementary School
 Perez Elementary School
 Prada Elementary School
 Roosevelt Elementary School
 United D.D. Hachar Elementary School

Feeder middle schools include:
 Los Obispos Middle School
 Salvador Garcia Middle School
 Lamar Bruni Vergara Middle School

References

External links
 

Johnson
United Independent School District high schools